Julie Mond is an American actress. She may be best known for establishing the role of Dr Lisa Niles on the daily soap opera General Hospital in November 2009, then being replaced by a different actress after two weeks. Mond also gained attention for her lead role as Ellen Barlow/Davis in the 2011 Hallmark Channel TV movies Love Begins and Love's Everlasting Courage—two of the twelve movies in the Love Comes Softly franchise.

Early life 
Born and raised on Long Island, Mond moved to New York City, graduating  from Barnard College at Columbia University. While in college, Mond appeared in commercials, local theater, and studied with acting teachers. After graduation, Mond moved to Los Angeles to pursue a career in acting.

Career 
She has appeared in several guest starring television roles, including CSI: NY, Cold Case, CSI: Miami, Ironside, Tell Me You Love Me and House. Mond had roles in films Something New (2006), Exit Speed (2008), Rest Stop: Don’t Look Back (2008), and Snake and Mongoose (2013). Since 2014, Mond has appeared mostly in short films.

Mond has appeared in several comedy sketches featured on the Funny or Die website.

Personal life 
In her free time, Mond volunteers at the non-profit organization Young Storytellers in Los Angeles.

Filmography

References

External links
 
 Julie Mond - Love Begins Cast

American television actresses
Barnard College alumni
Living people
American film actresses
Place of birth missing (living people)
21st-century American actresses
Year of birth missing (living people)